"The First Day of School" may refer to:

 "The First Day of School", a 1987 episode of Full House
 "The First Day of School", a 2010 episode of Rubicon